Edward Dewey Lothamer (May 20, 1942 - June 19, 2022) was an American football defensive tackle who played eight seasons in the American Football League and in the National Football League for the Kansas City Chiefs.

See also
 Other American Football League players

External links
 Kansas City Ambassadors profile

1942 births
2022 deaths
Players of American football from Detroit
American football defensive tackles
Michigan State Spartans football players
Kansas City Chiefs players
American Football League players